Altai is a sum (district) of Bayan-Ölgii Province in western Mongolia. As of 2014 it had a population of 3983 people.

History
Altai sum was established on February 12, 1959, by the Decree of the Presidium of the MPC of the Mongolian People's Republic. It formerly belonged to Jargalant and Sagsai, then both of Khovd Province.

Geography
To the southwest of the town is the lake, Darihan Nuur.

Economy
The main occupation in the district is agriculture. As of 2015 there were 120,650 livestock, consisting of 10,251 cattle, 57,106 sheep, 6,159 horses, 46,737 goats and 397 camels. 7620 tonnes of hay is harvested each year. The locals grows vegetables such as potatoes. 21 small business entities operated in the district as of 2015. Electricity has been provided in Altai since 2001 thanks to the establishment of a 10 kW hydropower substation, though only 50% of households have sewerage.

References

Populated places in Mongolia
Districts of Bayan-Ölgii Province